The Abbey of San Michele is a Benedictine Abbey located at the foot of Monte Vulture, on the eastern flank of the Lago di Monticchio Piccolo in Monticchio in the region of Basilicata, Italy.

History
The abbey was founded in the 10th century at the site of grottoes carved into a rock cliff. There is evidence of worship at the site from the 3rd to 4th century of the modern era. Veneration of St Michael Archangel was developed by the Italian-Greek monks at the site, who were then replaced by Benedictines, who erected the abbey, then abandoned it in 1456. it was occupied by the Capuchin friars. An 18th-century church was built at the site near the rock-cut chapel of San Michele.

References

 Abruzzo
Buildings and structures in Basilicata